The mountain rain frog (Breviceps montanus)  is a species of frogs in the family Brevicipitidae.

It is endemic to South Africa.

Its natural habitats are Mediterranean-type shrubby vegetation and plantations. It is threatened by habitat loss.

References

Breviceps
Endemic amphibians of South Africa
Amphibians described in 1926
Taxonomy articles created by Polbot